The electoral district of Preston is an electoral district of the Victorian Legislative Assembly. It currently centres on the northern Melbourne suburbs of Preston and Reservoir. It has always been a safe Labor Party seat.

The most prominent former member was Victoria Cross recipient William Ruthven. At the 2006 election Robin Scott was elected to succeed the retiring Michael Leighton who had been the member since the 1988 election. In 2022, Scott was succeeded by Nathan Lambert.

Members for Preston

Election results

References

External links
 Electorate profile: Preston District, Victorian Electoral Commission

Electoral districts of Victoria (Australia)
1945 establishments in Australia
City of Darebin
Electoral districts and divisions of Greater Melbourne